Larry Teng (born June 12, 1977) is an American television director and producer.

Education 
In 1999, Teng graduated with a degree in film from Ithaca College.

Career 
Teng has directed and produced for the television series Medium from 2007 to the series end in 2011. He also served as music and post-production supervisor on Ed. His other television directing credits include Hawaii Five-0, Warehouse 13, Person of Interest, Criminal Minds, Supergirl, Common Law, NCIS: Los Angeles, and Elementary. More recently, he signed an overall deal with CBS Studios. He directed the CW pilot of Walker: Independence for CBS Studios.

Filmography

Television 
 2011–2015 Hawaii Five-0 - Director. 11 episodes.
 2013–2016 Elementary - Director. 7 episodes.
 2016 Quantico - Director. 1 episode. (Season 1 episode Yes).
 2017–2018 SEAL Team - Director. 4 episodes.
 2018–2020 S.W.A.T - Director. 5 episodes.
 2018–2019 Runaways - Director. 5 episodes.
 2019–2022 Nancy Drew - Director. 15 episodes.
 2021-2023 NCIS: Hawai'i - Director and Executive Producer. Pilot episode.
 2022 Walker: Independence Director and Executive Producer. 3 episodes.

Personal life
In 2005, Teng married actress Lesley Boone. They divorced in 2013. Larry is a graduate of Herricks High School in New Hyde Park, New York.

References

External links

 Larry Teng at rottentomatoes.com

1977 births
Living people
American people of Chinese descent
American television directors
Television producers from New York City
People from Queens, New York